The Honda Capa, short for "capacity", is a tall wagon produced by Honda between 1998 and 2002 for the Japanese market. It was introduced at the 1997 Tokyo Motor Show as the concept car "J-MW." It went on sale on April 24, 1998, with Honda series codes GA4 and GA6. On September 16, 1999 a four-wheel drive version of the Capa was released, using Honda's Full-Time 4wd system. Brake Assist was offered as standard equipment. Due to disappointing sales the Capa nameplate was discontinued in 2002. It was available in Japan through the Honda Primo and Honda Verno dealerships.

General information
The Honda Capa was developed on the Honda Logo platform and is the first generation of the J Mover series. Its concept was based on a 'Small is Smart' way of thinking. Ease of use in everyday life, compactness, lightness and friendliness to the environment were some of the criteria built into the design. The proposal was that the Capa was to be 'joyful' however this translates better as 'fun'. It was one class larger than the kei-sized Honda Life, but smaller than the compact sized, Honda CR-V which based on the Honda Civic platform, and reflected the growing popularity of MPV/SUV/minivan vehicles.

The Honda Capa was designed with the intention of creating a car that was to be the best size for town driving. A car that could seat your family, with ample height for headroom and plenty of legroom considering its compact nature. To achieve this feat, Honda design the chassis based on a 'dual deck package.'

The Honda Capa was equipped with a 1.5-litre, single-overhead-cam, four-valve inline four-cylinder D15B engine. It was initially offered only with Honda's Multimatic continuously variable transmission (CVT), but following an update, a regular four-speed automatic transmission option was introduced as a lower cost option on front-wheel-drive versions.

Engine

 Water-cooled, inline four-cylinder Honda D15B engine
 Single Overhead Cam 16-valve
 Bore x Stroke: 75 mm x 84.5 mm
 Compression Ration: 9.4:1
 Honda's PGM-FI Fuel Injection System
 Fuel: Regular Unleaded
 Fuel Tank size:

GA4/6 model updates
1997 - Displayed at the Tokyo Motor Show as the J-MW
1998 - Announced that sales would begin April 24, 1998
1999 - Minor update, including minor remodelling of the bumpers, adding an AWD model to the line-up, 4-speed automatic transmission added to the line-up for the 2WD model only, Honda's Brake Assist system and Tachometer added as standard equipment.
2000 - Minor update. Front grille, bumper and seats were changed. Special Edition added to the line-up.
2001 - Honda Mobilio announced as the successor to the Honda Capa. Honda Capa production and sales continue.
2002 - February: Honda announces the end of production of the Capa due to slumping sales.

Origin of the name
Honda named the Capa based on the English word 'Capacity', referring to ability as well as spaciousness.

Gallery

See also
Honda Logo

External links

 https://web.archive.org/web/20070106105628/http://www.honda.co.jp/auto-lineup/capa/2002/

All-wheel-drive vehicles
Capa
Mini MPVs
Vehicles with CVT transmission
Cars introduced in 1998
2000s cars